
Gmina Ludwin is a rural gmina (administrative district) in Łęczna County, Lublin Voivodeship, in eastern Poland.

The gmina contains part of the protected area called Łęczna Lake District Landscape Park.

Villages
Gmina Ludwin contains the villages and settlements of Czarny Las, Dąbrowa, Dratów, Dratów-Kolonia, Jagodno, Kaniwola, Kobyłki, Kocia Góra, Krzczeń, Ludwin, Ludwin-Kolonia, Piaseczno, Rogóźno, Rozpłucie Drugie, Rozpłucie Pierwsze, Stary Radzic, Uciekajka, Zezulin Drugi, Zezulin Niższy and Zezulin Pierwszy.

Neighbouring gminas
Gmina Ludwin is bordered by the gminas of Cyców, Łęczna, Ostrów Lubelski, Puchaczów, Sosnowica, Spiczyn, Urszulin and Uścimów.

References

Polish official population figures 2006

Ludwin
Łęczna County